Aloys Pennarini, also spelled Alois Pennarini (born Aloys Federler; June 21, 1870 – June 23, 1927), was an opera singer. First (Spinto tenor) then heldentenor, opera director and film actor.

He was born in Vienna, Austria-Hungary. His teachers were Joseph Gansbacher and Johannes Ress in Vienna.

Singing career 
Debut 1893 Stadttheater Preßburg (Bratislava) as Turiddu in Cavalleria Rusticana (Mascagni)
1895–1896 Stadttheater Olmütz (Olomouc)
1896–1897 Stadttheater Elberfeld.
1898–1900 Stadttheater Graz now in Wagner roles
1900–1913 Stadttheater Hamburg
1904 Savage Opera Company in North America: Parsifal tour
Tour to London Covent Garden Opera, Amsterdam and Haag, also Philadelphia, United States, Chestnut Street Opera House
1905–1908 He made recordings for ODEON-Platten (Hamburg)

Directing career 
1913–1920 director from the Nürnberg Stadttheater also as a singer
1920 director Stadttheater von Reichenberg (Liberec) in Czechoslovakia

Acting career 
He performed in the German silent film Banditen (1920–21), directed by Max Agerty and produced by Singing film GmbH, Berlin. Pennarini portrayed Santanello, the head of the bandits. He performed the role of Heinrich Heine in the silent film Heinrich Heines Erste Liebe, directed by Eva Christa and released on January 25, 1922, by Vera Filmwerke AG, Hamburg. He was also in Mabel Und Ihre Freier, a silent film directed by Eva Christa released on August 26, 1922, by Vera Filmwerke AG, Hamburg.

Personal
Pennarini was once married to the soprano Ella Appelt( Gabriella) they had a son Anton .He married Clary Antoniette Nisser on May 19, 1909, and had four children: Heinz, Toni-Juliana, Isolde and Mathias.

He married Paula Weidenslaufer and moved with her to Liberec, Czechoslovakia, where he died on June 23, 1927.

External links 
 Photos and media

1870 births
1927 deaths
19th-century Austrian male opera singers
Austrian operatic tenors
Austrian expatriates in Czechoslovakia
People from Mödling District
Musicians from Liberec
20th-century Austrian male opera singers
Austrian male silent film actors
20th-century Austrian male actors